Cary Dale Allred (February 7, 1947 – December 10, 2011) was a member of the North Carolina General Assembly representing the state's sixty-fourth House district, including constituents in Alamance County. A business owner from Burlington, North Carolina, Allred was elected to eight terms in the state House. He previously served two terms in the state Senate. Allred served in the United States Navy, and has also served as an Alamance County commissioner. He spent the majority of his career as a Republican, but following a series of public controversies, he left the Republican Party in 2010 and registered as an independent.

Allred died December 10, 2011, in Greensboro, North Carolina at the age of 64.

Early life
Cary Allred was born February 7, 1947, in Mebane, North Carolina, and graduated from Southern Alamance High School in 1965. He then went on to serve in the U.S. Navy and graduate from Elon University in 1970.

Recent electoral history

2010
In March 2010, Allred changed his voter registration to unaffiliated and stated his intention to run for County Commissioner in Alamance County either as an independent or a write-in candidate. He was able to get enough signatures to qualify as a write-in, but eventually lost the race to Republican Tom Manning.

2008

2006

2004

2002

2000

Controversies
In 1981, while a state senator, Allred wrote letters on his company letterhead asking for opinions on health issues and to keep his company in mind for their needs. An investigation by the state Senate found this to be an ethics violation.

In August 2008, Allred caused a minor local controversy by handing out his legislative cards and state maps at a local Southern Alamance High School football game during his run for the North Carolina Legislature. He was asked to leave the premises.

In November 2008, after winning re-election, Allred left a series of answering machine messages bragging about his victory while sounding intoxicated. Allred claimed that he was "intoxicated with victory".

On the evening of April 27, 2009, Allred was pulled over by a North Carolina State Highway Patrolman, who observed the representative traveling 102 MPH in a 65 MPH zone. Allred stated that he had consumed one chelada. Later that evening, he arrived at the state legislature and embraced a 17-year-old page. Both Allred and the page have stated that they share a "Grandfather-granddaughter" relationship; however, on April 30, 2009, an investigation was launched by the Sergeant-at-Arms of the legislature.

On May 20, 2009, a report indicated that several persons had seen Allred behave "inappropriately" with the page. Mr. Allred threatened to leave the Republican Party. He then resigned the position on June 1, 2009.

On June 29, 2010, Allred was pulled over by Burlington police officers who observed him swerving into the lane opposite his and refused to take a sobriety test. At this point he was taken to the police station where he was given an alcohol-breath test but was unable to produce a sufficient amount of breath to produce a reading (he claimed that due to his bronchitis he was unable to produce enough breath) which resulted in it being recorded as a fail.

External links
Official legislative site
Report on page scandal
News & Observer: Allred to resign Monday

|-

 
|-

|-

References

County commissioners in North Carolina
Republican Party members of the North Carolina House of Representatives
Republican Party North Carolina state senators
People from Burlington, North Carolina
1947 births
2011 deaths
21st-century American politicians
20th-century American politicians
Elon University alumni
People from Mebane, North Carolina